Gyula Tóth (16 April 1927 in Salgótarján – 18 March 2001 in Budapest) was a Hungarian wrestler who competed in the 1956 Summer Olympics and in the 1960 Summer Olympics.

References

External links 
 
 

1927 births
2001 deaths
Olympic wrestlers of Hungary
Wrestlers at the 1956 Summer Olympics
Wrestlers at the 1960 Summer Olympics
Hungarian male sport wrestlers
Olympic bronze medalists for Hungary
Olympic medalists in wrestling
Medalists at the 1956 Summer Olympics
People from Salgótarján
Sportspeople from Nógrád County
20th-century Hungarian people